La Belle Montessori School, Inc. is an institution in Silang that was founded in September 1993. It offers high school, and foreign student exchange accepted with Bureau of Immigration accreditation.

History

La Belle Montessori School was originally envisioned by Florabelle Tupas. After Tupas' death on August 5, 1992, the plan was implemented by spouse William B. Tupas Jr., who at the time was chairman of the St. Anthony School board in Las Piñas.

Board of trustees 

 Founder: Florabelle M. Tupas
 President: William B. Tupas Jr.
 Vice president for administration: William M. Tupas III
 Vice president  for finance: Arlene T. Pesigan
 Principal: Elenita Parra
 Corporate secretary: Desiree Tupas
 Head registrar: Victoria D. Tupas
 Board member: Jonathan Tupas

 

High schools in Cavite
Educational institutions established in 1993
Montessori schools in the Philippines
Elementary schools in the Philippines
1993 establishments in the Philippines
Education in Silang, Cavite